Azra Fazal Pechuho (born 21 February 1953) is a Pakistani politician who is the current Provincial Minister of Sindh for Health, and  Population Welfare, in office since 19 August 2018. She has been a member of the Provincial Assembly of Sindh since August 2018. She was a member of the National Assembly of Pakistan, from 2002 to May 2018.

Early life and education
She was born on 21 February 1953 in Larkana, Sindh, Pakistan, to Hakim Ali Zardari and Bilquis Sultana. She has three siblings, Asif Ali Zardari, Fauzia Zardari and Faryal Talpur She is a physician by profession and has done MBBS from the Dow medical college.

She is married to Dr.Fazlullah Pechuho and has a son Muhammad Pechuho.

Political career

Pechuho was elected to the National Assembly of Pakistan as a candidate of Pakistan Peoples Party (PPP) from Constituency NA-213 (Nawabshah-I) in 2002 Pakistani general election. She received 75,237 votes and defeated Syed Zahid Hussain Shah, a candidate of Pakistan Muslim League (Q) (PML-Q).

She was not a popular politician until the assassination of Benazir Bhutto in 2007. After the assassination, she became the chancellor of Shaheed Zulfiqar Ali Bhutto Institute of Science and Technology (SZABIST).

Pechuho was re-elected to the National Assembly from NA-213 (Nawabshah-I) as a candidate of PPP in 2008 Pakistani general election. She received 108,404 votes and defeated Syed Zahid Hussain Shah, a candidate of Pakistan Muslim League (F) (PML-F).

Pechuho was re-elected to the National Assembly from Constituency NA-213 (Nawabshah-I) as a candidate of PPP in 2013 Pakistani general election. She received 113,199 votes and defeated Inayat Ali Rind, a candidate of Muttahida Qaumi Movement (MQM).

She was elected to the Provincial Assembly of Sindh as a candidate of PPP from Constituency PS-37 (Shaheed Benazirabad-I) in 2018 Pakistani general election.

On 19 August, she was inducted into the provincial Sindh cabinet of Chief Minister Syed Murad Ali Shah and was made Provincial Minister of Sindh for Health with the additional ministerial portfolio of Population Welfare.

References

Living people
1953 births
Pakistani MNAs 2002–2007
Pakistani MNAs 2008–2013
Pakistani MNAs 2013–2018
Women members of the National Assembly of Pakistan
Zardari family
Pakistan People's Party MPAs (Sindh)
Sindh MPAs 2018–2023
21st-century Pakistani women politicians